Carl Gustav Jung (26 July 1875 – 6 June 1961) was a Swiss psychiatrist and psychoanalyst who founded analytical psychology. Jung's work has been influential in the fields of psychiatry, anthropology, archaeology, literature, philosophy, psychology, and religious studies. Jung worked as a research scientist at the Burghölzli psychiatric hospital, in Zurich, under Eugen Bleuler. Jung established himself as an influential mind of his time, developing a friendship with Sigmund Freud, founder of psychoanalysis, conducting a lengthy correspondence, still paramount to their joint vision of human psychology. He is highly regarded as one of the most influential psychologists of all time.  

Freud saw the younger Jung as the heir he had been seeking to take forward his "new science" of psychoanalysis and to this end secured his appointment as president of his newly founded International Psychoanalytical Association. Jung's research and personal vision, however, made it difficult for him to follow his older colleague's doctrine and they parted ways. This division was personally painful for Jung and resulted in the establishment of Jung's analytical psychology as a comprehensive system separate from psychoanalysis.

Among the central concepts of analytical psychology is individuation—the lifelong psychological process of differentiation of the self out of each individual's conscious and unconscious elements. Jung considered it to be the main task of human development. He created some of the best known psychological concepts, including synchronicity, archetypal phenomena, the collective unconscious, the psychological complex and extraversion and introversion.

Jung was also an artist, craftsman, builder and a prolific writer. Many of his works were not published until after his death and some are still awaiting publication.

Biography

Early years

Childhood
 Carl Gustav Jung was born 26 July 1875 in Kesswil, in the Swiss canton of Thurgau, the first surviving son of Paul Achilles Jung (1842–1896) and Emilie Preiswerk (1848–1923). His birth was preceded by two stillbirths and the birth of a son named Paul, born in 1873, who survived only a few days.

Paul Jung, Carl's father, was the youngest son of noted German-Swiss professor of medicine at Basel, Karl Gustav Jung (1794–1864). Paul's hopes of achieving a fortune never materialised, and he did not progress beyond the status of an impoverished rural pastor in the Swiss Reformed Church. Emilie Preiswerk, Carl's mother, had also grown up in a large family, whose Swiss roots went back five centuries. Emilie was the youngest child of a distinguished Basel churchman and academic, Samuel Preiswerk (1799–1871), and his second wife. Samuel Preiswerk was an Antistes, the title given to the head of the Reformed clergy in the city, as well as a Hebraist, author, and editor, who taught Paul Jung as his professor of Hebrew at Basel University.

Jung's father was appointed to a more prosperous parish in Laufen, when Jung was six years old.  At this time, tensions between father and mother had developed. Jung's mother was an eccentric and depressed woman; she spent considerable time in her bedroom, where she said that spirits visited her at night. Although she was normal during the day, Jung recalled that at night his mother became strange and mysterious. He reported that one night he saw a faintly luminous and indefinite figure coming from her room with a head detached from the neck and floating in the air in front of the body. Jung had a better relationship with his father.

Jung's mother left Laufen for several months of hospitalization near Basel for an unknown physical ailment. His father took the boy to be cared for by Emilie Jung's unmarried sister in Basel, but he was later brought back to his father's residence. Emilie Jung's continuing bouts of absence and depression deeply troubled her son and caused him to associate women with "innate unreliability", whereas "father" meant for him reliability but also powerlessness. In his memoir, Jung would remark that this parental influence was the "handicap I started off with". Later, these early impressions were revised: "I have trusted men friends and been disappointed by them, and I have mistrusted women and was not disappointed." After three years of living in Laufen, Paul Jung requested a transfer. In 1879 he was called to Kleinhüningen, next to Basel, where his family lived in a parsonage of the church. The relocation brought Emilie Jung closer into contact with her family and lifted her melancholy. When he was nine years old, Jung's sister Johanna Gertrud (1884–1935) was born. Known in the family as "Trudi", she later became a secretary to her brother.

Memories of childhood
Jung was a solitary and introverted child. From childhood, he believed that like his mother, he had two personalities—a modern Swiss citizen and a personality more suited to the 18th century. "Personality Number 1", as he termed it, was a typical schoolboy living in the era of the time. "Personality Number 2" was a dignified, authoritative, and influential man from the past. Although Jung was close to both parents, he was disappointed by his father's academic approach to faith.

Some childhood memories made lifelong impressions on him. As a boy, he carved a tiny mannequin into the end of the wooden ruler from his pencil case and placed it inside the case. He added a stone, which he had painted into upper and lower halves, and hid the case in the attic. Periodically, he would return to the mannequin, often bringing tiny sheets of paper with messages inscribed on them in his own secret language. He later reflected that this ceremonial act brought him a feeling of inner peace and security. Years later, he discovered similarities between his personal experience and the practices associated with totems in indigenous cultures, such as the collection of soul-stones near Arlesheim or the tjurungas of Australia. He concluded that his intuitive ceremonial act was an unconscious ritual, which he had practiced in a way that was strikingly similar to those in distant locations which he, as a young boy, knew nothing about. His observations about symbols, archetypes, and the collective unconscious were inspired, in part, by these early experiences combined with his later research.

At the age of 12, shortly before the end of his first year at the Humanistisches Gymnasium in Basel, Jung was pushed to the ground by another boy so hard that he momentarily lost consciousness. (Jung later recognized that the incident was indirectly his fault.) A thought then came to him—"now you won't have to go to school anymore." From then on, whenever he walked to school or began homework, he fainted. He remained at home for the next six months until he overheard his father speaking hurriedly to a visitor about the boy's future ability to support himself. They suspected he had epilepsy. Confronted with the reality of his family's poverty, he realized the need for academic excellence. He went into his father's study and began poring over Latin grammar. He fainted three more times but eventually overcame the urge and did not faint again. This event, Jung later recalled, "was when I learned what a neurosis is."

University studies and early career

Initially, Jung had aspirations of becoming a preacher or minister in his early life. There was a strong moral sense in his household and several of his family members were clergymen as well. For a time, Jung had wanted to study archaeology, but his family could not afford to send him further than the University of Basel, which did not teach archaeology. After studying philosophy in his teens, Jung decided against the path of religious traditionalism and decided instead to pursue psychiatry and medicine. His interest was immediately captured—it combined the biological and the spiritual, exactly what he was searching for. In 1895 Jung began to study medicine at the University of Basel. Barely a year later in 1896, his father Paul died and left the family near destitute. They were helped out by relatives who also contributed to Jung's studies. During his student days, he entertained his contemporaries with the family legend that his paternal grandfather was the illegitimate son of Goethe and his German great-grandmother, Sophie Ziegler. In later life, he pulled back from this tale, saying only that Sophie was a friend of Goethe's niece.

In 1900, Jung moved to Zürich and began working at the Burghölzli psychiatric hospital under Eugen Bleuler. Bleuler was already in communication with the Austrian neurologist Sigmund Freud. Jung's dissertation, published in 1903, was titled On the Psychology and Pathology of So-Called Occult Phenomena. It was based on the analysis of the supposed mediumship of Jung's cousin Hélène Preiswerk, under the influence of Freud's contemporary Théodore Flournoy. Jung also studied with Pierre Janet in Paris in 1902 and later equated his view of the complex with Janet's idée fixe subconsciente. In 1905, Jung was appointed as a permanent 'senior' doctor at the hospital and also became a lecturer Privatdozent in the medical faculty of Zurich University. In 1904, he published with Franz Riklin their Diagnostic Association Studies, of which Freud obtained a copy. In 1909, Jung left the psychiatric hospital and began a private practice in his home in Küsnacht.

Eventually, a close friendship and a strong professional association developed between the elder Freud and Jung, which left a sizeable correspondence. For six years they cooperated in their work. In 1912, however, Jung published Psychology of the Unconscious, which made manifest the developing theoretical divergence between the two. Consequently, their personal and professional relationship fractured—each stating that the other was unable to admit he could be wrong. After the culminating break in 1913, Jung went through a difficult and pivotal psychological transformation, exacerbated by the outbreak of the First World War. Henri Ellenberger called Jung's intense experience a "creative illness" and compared it favorably to Freud's own period of what he called neurasthenia and hysteria.

Marriage
In 1903, Jung married Emma Rauschenbach, seven years his junior and the elder daughter of a wealthy industrialist in eastern Switzerland, Johannes Rauschenbach-Schenck. Rauschenbach was the owner, among other concerns, of IWC Schaffhausen—the International Watch Company, manufacturers of luxury time-pieces. Upon his death in 1905, his two daughters and their husbands became owners of the business. Jung's brother-in-law—Ernst Homberger—became the principal proprietor, but the Jungs remained shareholders in a thriving business that ensured the family's financial security for decades. Emma Jung, whose education had been limited, evinced considerable ability and interest in her husband's research and threw herself into studies and acted as his assistant at Burghölzli. She eventually became a noted psychoanalyst in her own right. They had five children: Agathe, Gret, Franz, Marianne, and Helene. The marriage lasted until Emma died in 1955.

During his marriage, Jung allegedly engaged in extramarital relationships. His alleged affairs with Sabina Spielrein and Toni Wolff were the most widely discussed. Though it was mostly taken for granted that Jung's relationship with Spielrein included a sexual relationship, this assumption has been disputed, in particular by Henry Zvi Lothane.

Wartime army service
During World War I, Jung was drafted as an army doctor and soon made commandant of an internment camp for British officers and soldiers. The Swiss were neutral and obliged to intern personnel from either side of the conflict who crossed their frontier to evade capture. Jung worked to improve the conditions of soldiers stranded in Switzerland and encouraged them to attend university courses.

Relationship with Freud

Meeting and collaboration

Jung and Freud influenced each other during the intellectually formative years of Jung's life. Jung had become interested in psychiatry as a student by reading Psychopathia Sexualis by Richard von Krafft-Ebing. In 1900, Jung completed his degree and started work as an intern (voluntary doctor) under the psychiatrist Eugen Bleuler at Burghölzli Hospital. It was Bleuler who introduced him to the writings of Freud by asking him to write a review of The Interpretation of Dreams (1899). In the early 1900s psychology as a science was still in its early stages, but Jung became a qualified proponent of Freud's new "psycho-analysis". At the time, Freud needed collaborators and pupils to validate and spread his ideas. Burghölzli was a renowned psychiatric clinic in Zurich and Jung's research had already gained him international recognition. Jung sent Freud a copy of his Studies in Word Association in 1906. The same year, he published Diagnostic Association Studies, which he later sent a copy of to Freudwho had already purchased a copy. Preceded by a lively correspondence, Jung met Freud for the first time in Vienna on March 3, 1907. Jung recalled the discussion between himself and Freud as interminable, unceasing for thirteen hours. Six months later, the then 50-year-old Freud sent a collection of his latest published essays to Jung in Zurich. This marked the beginning of an intense correspondence and collaboration that lasted six years. In 1908, Jung became an editor of the newly founded Yearbook for Psychoanalytical and Psychopathological Research.

In 1909, Jung travelled with Freud and Hungarian psychoanalyst Sándor Ferenczi to the United States; they took part in a conference at Clark University in Worcester, Massachusetts. The conference at Clark University was planned by the psychologist G. Stanley Hall and included twenty-seven distinguished psychiatrists, neurologists, and psychologists. It represented a watershed in the acceptance of psychoanalysis in North America. This forged welcome links between Jung and influential Americans. Jung returned to the United States the next year for a brief visit.

In 1910 Freud proposed Jung, "his adopted eldest son, his crown prince and successor", for the position of lifetime President of the newly formed International Psychoanalytical Association. However, after forceful objections from his Viennese colleagues, it was agreed Jung would be elected to serve a two-year term of office.

Divergence and break

While Jung worked on his Psychology of the Unconscious: a study of the transformations and symbolisms of the libido, tensions manifested between him and Freud because of various disagreements, including those concerning the nature of libido. Jung  the importance of sexual development and focused on the collective unconscious: the part of the unconscious that contains memories and ideas that Jung believed were inherited from ancestors. While he did think that libido was an important source for personal growth, unlike Freud, Jung did not believe that libido alone was responsible for the formation of the core personality.

In 1912 these tensions came to a peak because Jung felt severely slighted after Freud visited his colleague Ludwig Binswanger in Kreuzlingen without paying him a visit in nearby Zurich, an incident Jung referred to as "the Kreuzlingen gesture". Shortly thereafter, Jung again traveled to the United States and gave the Fordham University lectures, a six-week series, which were published later in the year as Psychology of the Unconscious (subsequently republished as Symbols of Transformation). While they contain some remarks on Jung's dissenting view on the libido, they represent largely a "psychoanalytical Jung" and not the theory of analytical psychology, for which he became famous in the following decades. Nonetheless, it was their publication which, Jung declared, "cost me my friendship with Freud".

Another primary disagreement with Freud stemmed from their differing concepts of the unconscious. Jung saw Freud's theory of the unconscious as incomplete and unnecessarily negative and inelastic. According to Jung, Freud conceived the unconscious solely as a repository of repressed emotions and desires. Jung's observations overlap to an extent with Freud's model of the unconscious, what Jung called the "personal unconscious", but his hypothesis is more about a process than a static model and he also proposed the existence of a second, overarching form of the unconscious beyond the personal, that he named the psychoid—a term borrowed from neo-vitalist philosopher and embryologist Hans Driesch (1867–1941)—but with a somewhat altered meaning. The collective unconscious is not so much a 'geographical location', but a deduction from the alleged ubiquity of archetypes over space and time.

In November 1912, Jung and Freud met in Munich for a meeting among prominent colleagues to discuss psychoanalytical journals. At a talk about a new psychoanalytic essay on Amenhotep IV, Jung expressed his views on how it related to actual conflicts in the psychoanalytic movement. While Jung spoke, Freud suddenly fainted and Jung carried him to a couch.

Jung and Freud personally met for the last time in September 1913 for the Fourth International Psychoanalytical Congress in Munich. Jung gave a talk on psychological types, the introverted and extraverted type in analytical psychology.

Midlife isolation
It was the publication of Jung's book Psychology of the Unconscious in 1912 that led to the break with Freud. Letters they exchanged show Freud's refusal to consider Jung's ideas. This rejection caused what Jung described in his (posthumous) 1962 autobiography, Memories, Dreams, Reflections, as a "resounding censure". Everyone he knew dropped away except for two of his colleagues. Jung described his book as "an attempt, only partially successful, to create a wider setting for medical psychology and to bring the whole of the psychic phenomena within its purview". The book was later revised and retitled Symbols of Transformation in 1922.

London 1913–14
Jung spoke at meetings of the Psycho-Medical Society in London in 1913 and 1914. His travels were soon interrupted by the war, but his ideas continued to receive attention in England primarily through the efforts of Constance Long who translated and published the first English volume of his collected writings.

The Black Books and The Red Book

In 1913, at the age of thirty-eight, Jung experienced a horrible "confrontation with the unconscious". He saw visions and heard voices. He worried at times that he was "menaced by a psychosis" or was "doing a schizophrenia". He decided that it was valuable experience and, in private, he induced hallucinations or, in his words, a process of "active imagination". He recorded everything he experienced in small journals, which Jung referred to in the singular as his Black Book, considering it a "single integral whole"; and while among these original journals, some have a brown cover.  The material Jung wrote was subjected to several edits, hand-written and typed, including another, "second layer" of text, his continual psychological interpretations during the process of editing.  Around 1915, Jung commissioned a large red leather-bound book, and began to transcribe his notes, along with painting, working intermittently for sixteen years.

Jung left no posthumous instructions about the final disposition of what he called the Liber Novus or the Red Book. Sonu Shamdasani, an historian of psychology from London, tried for three years to persuade Jung's resistant heirs to have it published. Ulrich Hoerni, Jung's grandson who manages the Jung archives, decided to publish it when the necessary additional funds needed were raised through the Philemon Foundation.  Up to mid-September 2008, fewer than two dozen people had ever seen it.

In 2007, two technicians for DigitalFusion, working with New York City publishers W. W. Norton & Company, scanned the manuscript with a 10,200-pixel scanner. It was published on 7 October 2009, in German with a "separate English translation along with Shamdasani's introduction and footnotes" at the back of the book. According to Sara Corbett, reviewing the text for The New York Times, "The book is bombastic, baroque and like so much else about Carl Jung, a willful oddity, synched with an antediluvian and mystical reality."

The Rubin Museum of Art in New York City displayed Jung's Red Book leather folio, as well as some of his original "Black Book" journals, from 7 October 2009 to 15 February 2010. According to them, "During the period in which he worked on this book Jung developed his principal theories of archetypes, collective unconscious, and the process of individuation." Two-thirds of the pages bear Jung's illuminations and illustrations to the text.

Travels
Jung emerged from his period of isolation in the late nineteen-tens with the publication of several journal articles, followed in 1921 with Psychological Types, one of his most influential books. There followed a decade of active publication, interspersed with overseas travels.

England (1920, 1923, 1925, 1935, 1938, 1946)
Constance Long arranged for Jung to deliver a seminar in Cornwall in 1920. Another seminar was held in 1923, this one organized by Jung's British protégé Helton Godwin Baynes (known as "Peter") (1882-1943), and another in 1925.

In 1935, at the invitation of his close British friends and colleagues, H. G. Baynes, E. A. Bennet and Hugh Crichton-Miller, Jung gave a series of lectures at the Tavistock Clinic in London, later published as part of the Collected Works.

In 1938, Jung was awarded an honorary degree by the University of Oxford. At the tenth International Medical Congress for Psychotherapy held at Oxford from 29 July to 2 August 1938, Jung gave the presidential address, followed by a visit to Cheshire to stay with the Bailey family at Lawton Mere.

In 1946, Jung agreed to become the first Honorary President of the newly formed Society of Analytical Psychology in London, having previously approved its training programme devised by Michael Fordham.

United States 1909–1912, 1924–25, 1936–37
During the period of Jung's collaboration with Freud, both visited the US in 1909 to lecture at Clark University, Worcester, Massachusetts where both were awarded honorary degrees. In 1912 Jung gave a series of lectures at Fordham University, New York which were published later in the year as Psychology of the Unconscious. Jung made a more extensive trip westward in the winter of 1924–5, financed and organized by Fowler McCormick and George Porter. Of particular value to Jung was a visit with Chief Mountain Lake of the Taos Pueblo near Taos, New Mexico.  Jung made another trip to America in 1936, receiving an honorary degree at Harvard and giving lectures in New York and New England for his growing group of American followers. He returned in 1937 to deliver the Terry Lectures at Yale University, later published as Psychology and Religion.

East Africa
In October 1925, Jung embarked on his most ambitious expedition, the "Bugishu Psychological Expedition" to East Africa. He was accompanied by his English friend, "Peter" Baynes and an American associate, George Beckwith. On the voyage to Africa, they became acquainted with an English woman named Ruth Bailey, who joined their safari a few weeks later. The group traveled through Kenya and Uganda to the slopes of Mount Elgon, where Jung hoped to increase his understanding of "primitive psychology" through conversations with the culturally isolated residents of that area. Later he concluded that the major insights he had gleaned had to do with himself and the European psychology in which he had been raised.  One of Jung's most famous proposed constructs is kinship libido. Jung defined this as an
instinctive feeling of belonging to a particular group or family and Jung believed it was vital to the human
experience and used this as an endogamous aspect of the libido and what lies amongst the family. This could be a term Jung learned during his trip to Africa and is similar to a Bantu term called Ubuntu that emphasizes humanity and almost the same meaning as kinship libido, which is, "I am because you are."

India
In December 1937, Jung left Zurich again for an extensive tour of India with Fowler McCormick. In India, he felt himself "under the direct influence of a foreign culture" for the first time. In Africa, his conversations had been strictly limited by the language barrier, but in India, he was able to converse extensively. Hindu philosophy became an important element in his understanding of the role of symbolism and the life of the unconscious, though he avoided a meeting with Ramana Maharshi. He described Ramana as being absorbed in "the self". Jung became seriously ill on this trip and endured two weeks of delirium in a Calcutta hospital. After 1938, his travels were confined to Europe.

Later years and death

Jung became a full professor of medical psychology at the University of Basel in 1943 but resigned after a heart attack the next year to lead a more private life. In 1945, he began corresponding with an English Roman Catholic priest, Father Victor White, who became a close friend of Jung, regularly visiting the Jungs at the Bollingen estate. Jung became ill again in 1952.

Jung continued to publish books until the end of his life, including Flying Saucers: A Modern Myth of Things Seen in the Skies (1959), which analyzed the archetypal meaning and possible psychological significance of the reported observations of UFOs. 

In 1961, Jung wrote his last work, a contribution to Man and His Symbols entitled "Approaching the Unconscious" (published posthumously in 1964). Jung died on 6 June 1961 at Küsnacht after a short illness. He had been beset by circulatory diseases.

Awards
Among his principal distinctions are honorary doctorates from:
 Clark University 1909
 Fordham University 1912 
 Harvard University 1936
 University of Allahabad 1937
 University of Benares 1937
 University of Calcutta 1938
 University of Oxford 1938
 University of Geneva 1945
 Swiss Federal Institute of Technology in Zurich 1955 on his 80th birthday

In addition, he was:

 given a Literature prize from the city of Zurich, 1932
 made Titular Professor of the Swiss Federal Institute of Technology in Zurich, ETH 1935 
 appointed Honorary Member of the Royal Society of Medicine 1939
 given a Festschrift at Eranos 1945
 appointed President of the Society of Analytical Psychology, London, 1946
 given a Festschrift by students and friends 1955
 named Honorary citizen of Kűsnacht 1960, on his 85th birthday.

Thought
Jung's thought was formed by early family influences, which on the maternal side were a blend of interest in the occult and in reformed academic theology. On his father's side were two important figures, his grandfather, the physician and academic scientist Karl Gustav Jung, and Lotte Kestner, the niece of German polymath Johann Wolfgang Goethe's "Lottchen". Although he was a practicing clinician and writer and as such founded analytical psychology, much of his life's work was spent exploring other areas such as quantum physics, vitalism, Eastern and Western philosophy including epistemology, alchemy, astrology, and sociology, as well as literature and the arts. Jung's interest in philosophy and spiritual subjects led many to view him as a mystic, although his preference was to be seen as a man of science; Jung was, unlike Freud, heavily knowledgeable on philosophical concepts and aimed to link the branch of epistemology to the more modern theories of psychology.

Key concepts
Within the field of analytical psychology, a brief survey of major concepts developed by Jung include (alphabetical):

 Anima and animus—(archetype) the contrasexual aspect of a person's psyche. In a woman's psyche, her inner personal masculine is conceived both as a complex and an archetypal image; comparably in a man's psyche, his inner personal feminine is conceived both as a complex and an archetypal image.
 Archetype—a concept "borrowed" from anthropology to denote supposedly universal and recurring mental images or themes. Jung's descriptions of archetypes varied over time.
 Archetypal images—universal symbols that can mediate opposites in the psyche, often found in religious art, mythology, and fairy tales across cultures.
 Collective unconscious—aspects of unconsciousness experienced by all people in different cultures.
 Complex—the repressed organisation of images and experiences that governs perception and behaviour.
 Extraversion and introversion—personality traits of degrees of openness or reserve contributing to psychological type.
 Individuation—the process of fulfilment of each individual "which negates neither the conscious or unconscious position but does justice to them both".
 Persona—element of the personality that arises "for reasons of adaptation or personal convenience"—the "masks" one puts on in various situations.
 Psychological types—a framework for consciously orienting psychotherapists to patients, by raising to consciousness particular modes of personality, differentiation between analyst and patient.
 Shadow—(archetype) the repressed, therefore unknown, aspects of the personality including those often considered to be negative.
 Self—(archetype) the central overarching concept governing the individuation process, as symbolised by mandalas, the union of male and female, totality, and unity. Jung viewed it as the psyche's central archetype.
 Synchronicity—an acausal principle as a basis for the apparently random simultaneous occurrence of phenomena.

Collective unconscious

Since the establishment of psychoanalytic theory, the notion and meaning of individuals having a personal unconscious has gradually come to be commonly accepted.  This was popularised by both Freud and Jung.  Whereas an individual's personal unconscious is made up of thoughts and emotions which have, at some time, been experienced or held in mind, but which have been repressed or forgotten, in contrast, the collective unconscious is neither acquired by activities within an individual's life, nor a container of things that are thoughts, memories or ideas which are capable of being conscious during one's life. The contents of it were never naturally "known" through physical or cognitive experience and then forgotten.

The collective unconscious consists of universal heritable elements common to all humans, distinct from other species. However, this does not necessarily imply a genetic cause. It encapsulates fields of evolutionary biology, history of civilization, ethnology, brain and nervous system development, and general psychological development. Considering its composition in practical physiological and psychological terms, "it consists of pre-existent forms, the archetypes, which can only become conscious secondarily and which give definite form to certain psychic contents."  Specifically contrasting himself from the work of Freud and Adler, who were wholly concerned with personal psychology, Jung writes about causal factors in personal psychology, as stemming from, influenced by an abstraction of the impersonal physical layer, the common and universal physiology among all humans. Jung considers that science would hardly deny the existence and basic nature of 'instincts', existing as a whole set of motivating urges. The collective unconscious acts as the frame where science can distinguish individual motivating urges, thought to be universal across all individuals of the human species, while instincts are present in all species. Jung contends, "the hypothesis of the collective unconscious is, therefore, no more daring than to assume there are instincts."

Archetype

The archetype is a concept "borrowed" from anthropology to denote a process of nature.  Jung's definitions of archetypes varied over time and have been the subject of debate as to their usefulness. Archetypal images, also referred to as motifs in mythology, are universal symbols that can mediate opposites in the psyche, are often found in religious art, mythology and fairy tales across cultures. Jung saw archetypes as pre-configurations in nature that give rise to repeating, understandable, describable experiences. In addition the concept takes into account the passage of time and of patterns resulting from transformation. Archetypes are said to exist independently of any current event, or its effect. They are said to exert influence both across all domains of experience and throughout the stages of each individual's unique development. Being in part based on heritable physiology, they are thought to have "existed" since humans became a differentiated species. They have been deduced through the development of storytelling over tens of thousands of years, indicating repeating patterns of individual and group experience, behaviors, and effects across the planet, apparently displaying common themes.

The concept did not originate with Jung but with Plato who first conceived of primordial patterns. Later contributions came from Adolf Bastian, and Hermann Usener among others. In the first half of the twentieth century it proved impossible to objectively isolate and categorize the notion of an archetype within a materialist frame.  According to Jung, there are "as many archetypes as there are typical situations in life", and he asserted that they have a dynamic mutual influence on one another. Their alleged presence could be extracted from thousand-year-old narratives, from comparative religion and mythology. Jung elaborated many archetypes in "The Archetypes and the Collective Unconscious" and in "Aion: Researches into the Phenomenology of the Self". Examples of archetypes might be the shadow, the hero, the self, anima, animus, mother, father, child, and trickster.

Shadow 

The shadow exists as part of the unconscious mind and is composed of the traits individuals instinctively or consciously resist identifying as their own and would rather ignore, typically: repressed ideas, weaknesses, desires, instincts, and shortcomings. Much of the shadow comes as a result of an individual's adaptation to cultural norms and expectations. Thus, this archetype not only consists of all the things deemed unacceptable by society but also those that are not aligned with one's own personal morals and values.

Jung argues that the shadow plays a distinctive role in balancing one's overall psyche, the counter-balancing to consciousness—"where there is light, there must also be shadow". Without a well-developed shadow (often "shadow work", "integrating one's shadow"), an individual can become shallow and extremely preoccupied with the opinions of others; that is, a walking persona. Not wanting to look at their shadows directly, Jung argues, often results in psychological projection.  Individuals project imagined attitudes onto others without awareness.  The qualities an individual may hate (or love) in another, may be manifestly present in the individual, who does not see the external, material truth. In order to truly grow as an individual, Jung believed that both the persona and shadow should be balanced.

The shadow can appear in dreams or visions, often taking the form of a dark, wild, exotic figure.

Extraversion and introversion

Jung was one of the first people to define introversion and extraversion in a psychological context. In Jung's Psychological Types, he theorizes that each person falls into one of two categories:  the introvert or the extravert. Jung compares these two psychological types to ancient archetypes, Apollo and Dionysus. The introvert is likened to Apollo, who shines a light on understanding. The introvert is focused on the internal world of reflection, dreaming, and vision. Thoughtful and insightful, the introvert can sometimes be uninterested in joining the activities of others. The extravert is associated with Dionysus, interested in joining the activities of the world. The extravert is focused on the outside world of objects, sensory perception, and action. Energetic and lively, the extravert may lose their sense of self in the intoxication of Dionysian pursuits. Jungian introversion and extraversion is quite different from the modern idea of introversion and extraversion. Modern theories often stay true to behaviourist means of describing such a trait (sociability, talkativeness, assertiveness, etc.), whereas Jungian introversion and extraversion are expressed as a perspective: introverts interpret the world subjectively, whereas extraverts interpret the world objectively.

Persona

In his psychological theory—which is not necessarily linked to a particular theory of social structure—the persona appears as a consciously created personality or identity, fashioned out of part of the collective psyche through socialization, acculturation and experience. Jung applied the term persona, explicitly because, in Latin, it means both personality and the masks worn by Roman actors of the classical period, expressive of the individual roles played.

The persona, he argues, is a mask for the "collective psyche", a mask that 'pretends' individuality, so that both self and others believe in that identity, even if it is really no more than a well-played role through which the collective psyche is expressed. Jung regarded the "persona-mask" as a complicated system which mediates between individual consciousness and the social community: it is "a compromise between the individual and society as to what a man should appear to be". But he also makes it quite explicit that it is, in substance, a character mask in the classical sense known to theatre, with its double function: both intended to make a certain impression on others, and to hide (part of) the true nature of the individual. The therapist then aims to assist the individuation process through which the client (re)gains their "own self"—by liberating the self, both from the deceptive cover of the persona, and from the power of unconscious impulses.

Jung has become enormously influential in management theory; not just because managers and executives have to create an appropriate "management persona" (a corporate mask) and a persuasive identity, but also because they have to evaluate what sort of people the workers are, to manage them (for example, using personality tests and peer reviews).

Spirituality

Jung's work on himself and his patients convinced him that life has a spiritual purpose beyond material goals. Our main task, he believed, is to discover and fulfill our deep, innate potential. Based on his study of Christianity, Hinduism, Buddhism, Gnosticism, Taoism, and other traditions, Jung believed that this journey of transformation, which he called individuation, is at the mystical heart of all religions. It is a journey to meet the self and at the same time to meet the Divine. Unlike Freud's objectivist worldview, Jung's pantheism may have led him to believe that spiritual experience was essential to our well-being, as he specifically identifies individual human life with the universe as a whole.

In 1959, Jung was asked by host John Freeman on the BBC interview program Face to Face whether he believed in God, to which Jung answered, "I do not need to believe. I know." Jung's ideas on religion counterbalance Freudian skepticism. Jung's idea of religion as a practical road to individuation is still treated in modern textbooks on the psychology of religion, though his ideas have also been criticized.

Jung recommended spirituality as a cure for alcoholism, and he is considered to have had an indirect role in establishing Alcoholics Anonymous. Jung once treated an American patient (Rowland Hazard III), who had chronic alcoholism. After working with the patient for some time and achieving no significant progress, Jung told the man that his alcoholic condition was near to hopeless, save only the possibility of a spiritual experience. Jung noted that, occasionally, such experiences had been known to reform alcoholics when all other options had failed.

Hazard took Jung's advice seriously and set about seeking a personal, spiritual experience. He returned home to the United States and joined a Christian evangelical movement known as the Oxford Group (later known as Moral Re-Armament). He also told other alcoholics what Jung had told him about the importance of a spiritual experience. One of the alcoholics he brought into the Oxford Group was Ebby Thacher, a long-time friend and drinking buddy of Bill Wilson, later co-founder of Alcoholics Anonymous (AA). Thacher told Wilson about the Oxford Group, and, through them, Wilson became aware of Hazard's experience with Jung. The influence of Jung thus indirectly found its way into the formation of Alcoholics Anonymous, the original twelve-step program.

The above claims are documented in the letters of Jung and Bill Wilson, excerpts of which can be found in Pass It On, published by Alcoholics Anonymous. Although the detail of this story is disputed by some historians, Jung himself discussed an Oxford Group member, who may have been the same person, in talks given around 1940. The remarks were distributed privately in transcript form, from shorthand taken by an attender (Jung reportedly approved the transcript), and later recorded in Volume 18 of his Collected Works, The Symbolic Life,

Jung goes on to state that he has seen similar cures among Roman Catholics. The 12 step program of Alcoholics Anonymous has an intense psychological backdrop, involving the human ego and dichotomy between the conscious and unconscious mind.

Inquiries into the paranormal 

Jung had an apparent interest in the paranormal and occult. For decades he attended seances and claimed to have witnessed "parapsychic phenomena". Initially, he attributed these to psychological causes, even delivering a 1919 lecture in England for the Society for Psychical Research on "The Psychological Foundations for the belief in spirits". However, he began to "doubt whether an exclusively psychological approach can do justice to the phenomena in question" and stated that "the spirit hypothesis yields better results". But he retained some skepticism toward his own postulation, as he could not find material evidence of the existence of spirits.

Jung's ideas about the paranormal culminated in "synchronicity".  This is the idea that certain coincidences manifest in the world, have exceptionally intense meaning to observers.  Such coincidences have great effect on the observer from multiple cumulative aspects: from the immediate personal relevance of the coincidence to the observer; from the peculiarities of (the nature of, the character, novelty, curiosity of) any such coincidence; from the sheer improbability of the coincidence, having no apparent causal link (hence Jung's essay subtitle "An Acausal Connecting Principle").  Despite his own experiments failing to confirm the phenomenon he held on to the idea as an explanation for apparent ESP. In addition, he proposed it as a functional explanation for how the I-Ching worked, although he was never clear about how synchronicity worked.

Interpretation of quantum mechanics
Jung influenced one philosophical interpretation (not the science) of quantum physics with the concept of synchronicity regarding some events as non-causal. That idea influenced the physicist Wolfgang Pauli (with whom, via a letter correspondence, he developed the notion of unus mundus in connection with the notion of nonlocality) and some other physicists.

Alchemy

Jung's acquaintance with alchemy came between 1928 and 1930, when he was introduced to a manuscript of The Secret of the Golden Flower, translated by Richard Wilhelm.  The work and writings of Jung from the 1930s onwards shifted to a focus on the psychological significance of alchemy.

In 1944 Jung published Psychology and Alchemy, in which he analyzed the alchemical symbols and came to the conclusion that there is a direct relationship between them and the psychoanalytical process. He argued that the alchemical process was the transformation of the impure soul (lead) to perfected soul (gold), and a metaphor for the individuation process.

In 1963 Mysterium Coniunctionis first appeared in English as part of The Collected Works of C. G. Jung. Mysterium Coniunctionis was Jung's last major book and focused on the "Mysterium Coniunctionis" archetype, known as the sacred marriage between sun and moon. Jung argued that the stages of the alchemists, the blackening, the whitening, the reddening, and the yellowing, could be taken as symbolic of individuation—his chosen term for personal growth (75).

Art therapy

Jung proposed that art can be used to alleviate or contain feelings of trauma, fear, or anxiety and also to repair, restore and heal. In his work with patients and his own personal explorations, Jung wrote that art expression and images found in dreams could help recover from trauma and emotional distress. At times of emotional distress, he often drew, painted, or made objects and constructions which he recognized as more than recreational.

Dance/movement therapy 
Dance/movement therapy as active imagination was created by Carl Gustav Jung and Toni Wolff in 1916 and was practiced by Tina Keller-Jenny and other analysts, but remained largely unknown until the 1950s when it was rediscovered by Marian Chace and therapist Mary Whitehouse. Whitehouse, after studying with Martha Graham and Mary Wigman, became herself a dancer and teacher of modern dance, as well as Swiss Dancer Trudy Schoop in 1963, who is considered one of the founders of the dance/movement therapy in the United States.

Political views

The state
Jung stressed the importance of individual rights in a person's relation to the state and society. He saw that the state was treated as "a quasi-animate personality from whom everything is expected" but that this personality was "only camouflage for those individuals who know how to manipulate it", and referred to the state as a form of slavery. He also thought that the state "swallowed up [people's] religious forces", and therefore that the state had "taken the place of God"—making it comparable to a religion in which "state slavery is a form of worship". Jung observed that "stage acts of [the] state" are comparable to religious displays: 

From Jung's perspective, this replacement of God with the state in a mass society leads to the dislocation of the religious drive and results in the same fanaticism of the church-states of the Dark Ages—wherein the more the state is 'worshipped', the more freedom and morality are suppressed; this ultimately leaves the individual psychically undeveloped with extreme feelings of marginalization.

Germany, 1933 to 1939
Jung had many Jewish friends and colleagues and maintained relations with them throughout the 1930s despite prevailing anti-semitism. Until 1939, he also maintained professional relations with psychotherapists in Germany who had declared their support for the Nazi regime. Some scholars allege that he himself sympathized with the regime.

In 1933, after the Nazis gained power in Germany, Jung took part in the restructuring of the General Medical Society for Psychotherapy (Allgemeine Ärztliche Gesellschaft für Psychotherapie), a German-based professional body with an international membership. The society was reorganized into two distinct bodies:
 A strictly German body, the Deutsche Allgemeine Ärztliche Gesellschaft für Psychotherapie, led by Matthias Göring, an Adlerian psychotherapist and a cousin of the prominent Nazi Hermann Göring
 International General Medical Society for Psychotherapy, led by Jung. The German body was to be affiliated to the international society, as were new national societies being set up in Switzerland and elsewhere.

The International Society's constitution permitted individual doctors to join it directly, rather than through one of the national affiliated societies, a provision to which Jung drew attention in a circular in 1934. This implied that German Jewish doctors could maintain their professional status as individual members of the international body, even though they were excluded from the German affiliate, as well as from other German medical societies operating under the Nazis.

As leader of the international body, Jung assumed overall responsibility for its publication, the Zentralblatt für Psychotherapie. In 1933, this journal published a statement endorsing Nazi positions and Hitler's book Mein Kampf. In 1934, Jung wrote in a Swiss publication, the Neue Zürcher Zeitung, that he experienced "great surprise and disappointment" when the Zentralblatt associated his name with the pro-Nazi statement.

Jung went on to say "the main point is to get a young and insecure science into a place of safety during an earthquake". He did not end his relationship with the Zentralblatt at this time, but he did arrange the appointment of a new managing editor, Carl Alfred Meier of Switzerland. For the next few years, the Zentralblatt under Jung and Meier maintained a position distinct from that of the Nazis, in that it continued to acknowledge contributions of Jewish doctors to psychotherapy. In the face of energetic German attempts to Nazify the international body, Jung resigned from its presidency in 1939, the year the Second World War started.

Nazism and antisemitism
Jung's interest in European mythology and folk psychology was shared by the Nazis. Richard Noll describes Jung's own reaction to this connection:

Various statements made by Jung in the 1930s have been cited as evidence of both contempt for Nazism and sympathy for Nazism. In the 1936 essay "Wotan", Jung described the influence of Adolf Hitler on Germany as "one man who is obviously 'possessed' has infected a whole nation to such an extent that everything is set in motion and has started rolling on its course towards perdition." He would later say, during a lengthy interview with H. R. Knickerbocker in October 1938:

Jung consistently rejected accusations of antisemitism. In a 1948 interview with Carol Baumann, he stated:

The accusations, however, have continued to be made concerning Jung's statements. Avner Falk cites articles such as "The State of Psychotherapy Today", published in 1934 in the Zentralblatt fur Psychotherapie, where Jung wrote: "The Aryan unconscious has a greater potential than the Jewish unconscious" and "The Jew, who is something of a nomad, has never yet created a cultural form of his own and as far as we can see never will". Andrew Samuels argues that his remarks on the "Aryan unconscious" and the "corrosive character" of Freud's "Jewish gospel" demonstrate an antisemitism "fundamental to the structure of Jung's thought".

Service to the Allies during World War II
Jung was in contact with Allen Dulles of the Office of Strategic Services (predecessor of the Central Intelligence Agency) and provided valuable intelligence on the psychological condition of Hitler.  Dulles referred to Jung as "Agent 488" and offered the following description of his service: "Nobody will probably ever know how much Professor Jung contributed to the Allied Cause during the war, by seeing people who were connected somehow with the other side".  Jung's service to the Allied cause through the OSS remained classified after the war.

Views on homosexuality
Jung addressed homosexuality in his published writings, in one comment specifying that homosexuality should not be a concern of legal authorities nor be considered a crime. He also stated that homosexuality does not reduce the value of a person as a member of society. However, Jung also said that homosexuality is a result of psychological immaturity,

Psychedelics

Jung's theories are considered to be a useful therapeutic framework for the analysis of unconscious phenomena that become manifest in the acute psychedelic state. This view is based on correspondence Jung had with researchers involved in psychedelic research in the 1950s, as well as more recent neuroimaging research where subjects who are administered psychedelic compounds seem to have archetypal religious experiences of "unity" and "ego dissolution" associated with reduced activity in the default mode network.

This research has led to a re-evaluation of Jung's work, and particularly the visions detailed in The Red Book, in the context of contemporary psychedelic, evolutionary and developmental neuroscience. For example, in a chapter entitled 'Integrating the Archaic and the Modern: The Red Book, Visual Cognitive Modalities and the Neuroscience of Altered States of Consciousness', in the 2020 volume Jung's Red Book for Our Time: Searching for Soul Under Postmodern Conditions, Volume 4, it is argued Jung was a pioneer who explored uncharted "cognitive domains" that are alien to Western modes of thought. While such domains of experience are not part of mainstream Western culture and thought, they are central to various Indigenous cultures who use psychedelics such as Iboga and Ayahuasca during rituals to alter consciousness. As the author writes: "Jung seems to have been dealing with modes of consciousness alien to mainstream Western thought, exploring the terrain of uncharted cognitive domains. I argue that science is beginning to catch up with Jung who was a pioneer whose insights contribute a great deal to our emerging understanding of human consciousness." In this analysis Jung's paintings of his visions in The Red Book were compared to the paintings of Ayahuasca visions by the Peruvian shaman Pablo Amaringo.

Commenting on research that was being undertaken during the 1950s, Jung wrote the following in a letter to Betty Eisner, a psychologist who was involved in LSD research at the University of California: "Experiments along the line of mescaline and related drugs are certainly most interesting since such drugs lay bare a level of the unconscious that is otherwise accessible only under peculiar psychic conditions. It is a fact that you get certain perceptions and experiences of things appearing either in mystical states or in the analysis of unconscious phenomena."

A detailed account of Jung and psychedelics, as well as the importance of Jungian psychology to psychedelic-assisted therapies, is outlined in Scott Hill's 2013 book Confrontation with the Unconscious: Jungian Depth Psychology and Psychedelic Experience. An article published in 2021 in the International Journal of Jungian Studies, entitled 'Carl Jung and the Psychedelic Brain: An Evolutionary Model of Analytical Psychology Informed by Psychedelic Neuroscience' discusses Jung's attitude towards psychedelics, as well as the applicability of his ideas  to current research. As the author writes Jung's '...legitimate reservations about the clinical use of psychedelics are no longer relevant as the field has progressed significantly, devising robust clinical and experimental protocols for psychedelic assisted therapies. That said Jung's concept of individuation—that is the integration of the archaic unconscious with consciousness—seems extremely pertinent to modern psychedelic research.'  The author also uses work in evolutionary and psychedelic neuroscience, and specifically the latter's ability to make manifest ancient subcortical brain systems, to illuminate Jung's concept of an archaic collective unconscious that evolved prior to the ego complex and the uniquely human default mode network.

Legacy
The Myers–Briggs Type Indicator (MBTI), a psychometric instrument mostly popular with non-psychologists, as well as the concepts of socionics, were developed from Jung's model of psychological types. The MBTI is considered pseudoscience and is not widely accepted by researchers in the field of psychology. 

Jung saw the human psyche as "by nature religious" and made this idea a principal focus of his explorations. Jung is one of the best known contemporary contributors to dream analysis and symbolization. His influence on popular psychology, the "psychologization of religion", spirituality and the New Age movement has been immense. A Review of General Psychology survey, published in 2002, ranked Jung as the 23rd most cited psychologist of the 20th century. 

Although psychoanalysis is still studied in the humanities, a 2008 study in The Journal of the American Psychoanalytic Association found that psychology departments and textbooks treat it as "desiccated and dead". Similarly, Alan Stone noted, "As academic psychology becomes more 'scientific' and psychiatry more biological, psychoanalysis is being brushed aside."

Houses and institutions
 C. G. Jung House Museum
 Bollingen Tower
 Psychology Club Zürich
 C. G. Jung Institute, Zürich
 Society of Analytical Psychology

Organizations
 International Association for Analytical Psychology
 International Association for Jungian Studies

In popular culture

Literature
 Laurens van der Post was an Afrikaner author who claimed to have had a 16-year friendship with Jung, from which a number of books and a film were created about Jung. The accuracy of van der Post's claims about his relationship to Jung has been questioned.
 Hermann Hesse, author of works such as Siddhartha and Steppenwolf, was treated by Joseph Lang, a student of Jung. For Hesse this began a long preoccupation with psychoanalysis, through which he came to know Jung personally.
 In his novel The World is Made of Glass (1983), Morris West gives a fictional account of one of Jung's cases, placing the events in 1913. According to the author's note, the novel is "based upon a case recorded, very briefly, by Carl Gustav Jung in his autobiographical work Memories, Dreams, Reflections".
 The Canadian novelist Robertson Davies made Jungian analysis a central part of his 1970 novel The Manticore. He stated in a letter, "There have been other books which describe Freudian analyses, but I know of no other that describes a Jungian analysis" adding "I was deeply afraid that I would put my foot in it, for I have never undergone one of those barnacle-scraping experiences, and knew of it only through reading. So, I was greatly pleased when some of my Jungian friends in Zurich liked it very much."
 Pilgrim
 Possessing the Secret of Joy, a novel in which Jung is a therapist character—
 The Interpretation of Murder

Art

 The visionary Swiss painter Peter Birkhäuser was treated by a student of Jung, Marie-Louise von Franz, and corresponded with Jung about the translation of dream symbolism into works of art.
 American Abstract Expressionist Jackson Pollock underwent Jungian psychotherapy in 1939 with Joseph Henderson. Henderson engaged Pollock through his art, having him make drawings, which led to the appearance of many Jungian concepts in his paintings.
 Contrary to some sources, Jung did not visit Liverpool but recorded a dream in which he did, and of which he wrote, "Liverpool is the pool of life, it makes to live." A plaster statue of Jung was erected in Mathew Street in 1987 that was vandalised and replaced by a more durable version in 1993.

Music
 Musician David Bowie described himself as Jungian in his relationship to dreams and the unconscious. Bowie sang of Jung on his album Aladdin Sane (a pun on "a lad insane") and attended the exhibition of The Red Book in New York with artist Tony Oursler, who described Bowie as "reading and speaking of the psychoanalyst with passion".  Bowie's 1967 song "Shadow Man" encapsulates a key Jungian concept, while in 1987 Bowie described the Glass Spiders of Never Let Me Down as Jungian mother figures around which he not only anchored a worldwide tour but also created an enormous onstage effigy.
British rock band The Police released an album titled Synchronicity in 1983.
Banco de Gaia called his 2009 electronic music album, Memories Dreams Reflections. 
The American rock band Tool was influenced by Jungian concepts in its album Ænima, the title a play on the concepts of anima and animus. In the song "Forty Six & 2", the singer seeks to become a more evolved self by exploring and overcoming his Shadow.
 Argentinian musician Luis Alberto Spinetta was influenced by Jung's texts in his 1975 conceptual album Durazno sangrando, specifically the songs "Encadenado al ánima" and "En una lejana playa del ánimus", which deal with anima and animus.
 Jung appeared on the front cover of The Beatles' Sgt. Pepper's Lonely Hearts Club Band.
 The South Korean band BTS's 2019 album Map of the Soul: Persona is based on Jung's Map of the Soul, which gives the basic principles of Jung's analytical psychology. It includes an intro song titled Persona rapped by group leader RM, who asks, "who am I?", and is confronted with various versions of himself with the words "Persona", "Shadow", and "Ego", referring to Jung's theories. On 21 February 2020, the band released Map of the Soul: 7, which specifically focuses on Jung's "Shadow" and "Ego" theories. As part of the first phase of the band's comeback, Interlude: Shadow, rapped by Suga and released on 10 January, addresses the shadows and the darkness that go hand-in-hand with the light and attention shone on celebrities. The next comeback trailer, "Outro: Ego", performed by J-Hope, ends with his declaration of self and ego as he appears within a colourful city "in which the artist's current image is projected".

Theatre, film, television and radio
 Federico Fellini brought to the screen exuberant imagery shaped by his encounter with Jung's ideas, especially Jungian dream interpretation. Fellini preferred Jung to Freud because Jungian analysis defined the dream not as a symptom of a disease that required a cure but rather as a link to archetypal images shared by all of humanity.
 The BBC interviewed Jung for Face to Face with John Freeman at Jung's home in Zurich in 1959.
 Stephen Segaller produced a documentary on Jung as part of his "World of Dreams", Wisdom of the Dream in 1985. It was re-issued in 2018. It was followed by a book of the same title.
 Stanley Kubrick's 1987 film Full Metal Jacket has an underlying theme about the duality of man. In one scene, a colonel asks a soldier, "You write 'Born to Kill' on your helmet and you wear a peace button. What's that supposed to be, some kind of sick joke?" The soldier replies, "I think I was trying to suggest something about the duality of man, sir...the Jungian thing, sir."
 A Dangerous Method, a 2011 film directed by David Cronenberg based on Hampton's play The Talking Cure, is a fictional dramatisation of Jung's life between 1904 and 1913. It mainly concerns his relationships with Freud and Sabina Spielrein, a Russian woman who became his lover and student and, later, an analyst herself.
 More recently, Robert Eggers psychological thriller, The Lighthouse has elements strongly influenced by Jung's work with Eggers hoping that "it's a movie where both Jung and Freud would be furiously eating their popcorn".
 Soul, a 2020 Pixar film written by Pete Docter, Mike Jones and Kemp Powers, includes brief appearances of Jung as an ethereal cartoon character, "Soul Carl Jung".
 In the online animated series, Super Science Friends, Jung, voiced by Tom Park, is featured as one of the recurrent antagonists against Sigmund Freud.
 Matter of Heart (1986), Documentary on the famous Swiss psychoanalyst, Carl Gustav Jung, featuring interviews with those who knew him and archive footage of Jung.
On 2 December 2004, BBC Radio 4's In Our Time broadcast a programme on 'the mind and theories' of Jung.

Video games
 The Persona series of games is heavily based on Jung's theories, as is the Nights into Dreams series of games. 
Xenogears for the original PlayStation and its associated works—including its reimagination as the "Xenosaga" trilogy and a graphic novel published by the game's creator, Perfect Works—center around Jungian concepts. Control centers around Jung's theories of the darkness and the astral plane. Jungian concepts are present in the Xenoseries.
Jung's Labyrinth is a psychological exploration PC game that uses Jungian psychology, mythology, alchemical, and dream symbolism in a series of active imaginations to map the process of individuation. The Jungian concepts are represented mostly by the 12 archetypes that the player engages in a conversation.
The game Control is heavily influenced by Carl Jung's ideas, particularly synchronicity and shadow selves.

Bibliography

Books
 1910 About the conflicts of a child's soul
 1912 Psychology of the Unconscious
 1916 Seven Sermons to the Dead (a part of the Red Book, published privately)
 1921 Psychological Types
 1933 Modern Man in Search of a Soul (essays)
 1944 Psychology and Alchemy
 1951 Aion: Researches into the Phenomenology of the Self
 1952 Symbols of Transformation (revised edition of Psychology of the Unconscious)
 1954 Answer to Job
 1956 Mysterium Coniunctionis: An Inquiry into the Separation and Synthesis of Psychic Opposites in Alchemy
 1959 Flying Saucers: A Modern Myth of Things Seen in the Skies (Translated by R. F. C. Hull)
 1960 Synchronicity: An Acausal Connecting Principle
 1962 Memories, Dreams, Reflections (autobiography, co-written with Aniela Jaffé)
 1964 Man and His Symbols (Jung contributed one part, his last writing before his death in 1961; the other four parts are by Marie-Louise von Franz, Joseph L. Henderson, Jaffé, and Jolande Jacobi)
 2009 The Red Book: Liber Novus (manuscript produced circa 1915–1932)
 2020 Black Books (private journals produced circa 1913–1932, on which the Red Book is based)

Collected Works

The Collected Works of C. G. Jung. Eds. Herbert Read, Michael Fordham, Gerhard Adler. Executive ed. W. McGuire. Trans R.F.C. Hull. London: Routledge Kegan Paul (1953–1980).

1.   Psychiatric Studies (1902–06)
2.   Experimental Researches  (1904–10) (trans L. Stein and D. Riviere)
3.   Psychogenesis of Mental Disease  (1907–14; 1919–58)
4.   Freud and Psychoanalysis  (1906–14; 1916–30)
5.   Symbols of Transformation  (1911–12; 1952)
6.   Psychological Types  (1921)
7.   Two Essays on Analytical Psychology  (1912–28)
8.   Structure and Dynamics of the Psyche  (1916–52)
9.1  Archetypes and the Collective Unconscious  (1934–55)
9.2  Aion: Researches into the Phenomenology of the Self  (1951)
10.  Civilization in Transition (1918–1959)
11.  Psychology and Religion: West and East  (1932–52)
12.  Psychology and Alchemy   (1936–44)
13.  Alchemical Studies   (1919–45):
14.  Mysterium Coniunctionis  (1955–56):
15.  Spirit in Man, Art, and Literature (1929–1941)
16.  The Practice of Psychotherapy  (1921–25)
17.  The Development of Personality  (1910; 1925–43)
18.  The Symbolic Life: Miscellaneous Writings  
19.  General Bibliography 
20.  General Index

Supplementary volumes

A.  The Zofingia Lectures
B.  Psychology of the Unconscious (trans. Beatrice M. Hinckle)

Seminars

Analytical Psychology (1925)
Dream Analysis (1928–30)
Visions (1930-34)
The Kundalini Yoga (1932)
Nietzsche's Zarathustra (1934-39)
Children's Dreams (1936-1940)

See also

Topics

 Archetypal literary criticism
 Archetypal pedagogy
 Archetypal psychology
 Big Five personality traits
 Cryptomnesia
 Jungian Type Index
 Jung Type Indicator
 Keirsey Temperament Sorter
 Logos
 Logotherapy
 Myers–Briggs Type Indicator
 Neo-Freudian
 Nekyia
 Participation mystique
 Psychodynamics
 Reincarnation
 Synesthesia
 The Sekhmet Hypothesis – archetypal symbolism presented by youth trends
 Wounded healer

People

 Gerhard Adler—friend and co-editor of the Collected Works in English
 John Beebe—Jungian analyst, typologist, and commentator on Jungian ideas
 Martin Buber—see the Buber–Jung disputations
 Irene Claremont de Castillejo—an analytical psychologist who trained with the Jungs and Toni Wolff and author on the feminine
 Isabel Briggs Myers & Katharine Cook Briggs–American writers and co-creators of a personality inventory known as the Myers–Briggs Type Indicator (MBTI) and based on theories of Carl Jung
 Linda Fierz-David—one of the earliest Jungian analysts in Zurich
 Otto Gross—colleague, analyst, and influence on Jung
 Mary Esther Harding—British doctor who became one of the earliest Jungian analysts in the United States
 Carl Kerenyi—Hungarian scholar of Greek mythology, colleague, and influence on Jung
 Margaret Lowenfeld—British doctor and creator of sandplay and tutor of the Swiss Jungian, Dora Kalff, who developed sandplay as a diagnostic tool
 Winifred Rushforth—Edinburgh doctor, missionary in India, and clinic founder who corresponded with Jung
 Herbert Silberer—Early colleague and influence on Jung
 Anthony Stevens—analytical psychologist, psychiatrist, and author
 D. T. Suzuki—see An Introduction to Zen Buddhism, for which C. G. Jung wrote a preface
 Frances Wickes—early American Jungian child therapist, lecturer, author, and friend of Jung

Notes

References

Sources

Further reading

Introductory texts
 Carl Gustav Jung, Analytical Psychology: Its Theory and Practice (The Tavistock Lectures) (Ark Paperbacks), 1990, 

 The Basic Writings of C. G. Jung, edited by V. S. de Laszlo (The Modern Library, 1959),  
 Edward F Edinger, Ego and Archetype, (Shambhala Publications), 
 Robert Hopcke, A Guided Tour of the Collected Works of C. G. Jung, 
 Edward C. Whitmont, The Symbolic Quest: Basic Concepts of Analytical Psychology, Princeton University Press, Princeton, New Jersey, 1969, 1979, 
 

Texts in various areas of Jungian thought
 Robert Aziz, C. G. Jung's Psychology of Religion and Synchronicity (1990), currently in its 10th printing, is a refereed publication of State University of New York Press. 
 Robert Aziz, Synchronicity and the Transformation of the Ethical in Jungian Psychology in Carl B. Becker, ed., Asian and Jungian Views of Ethics. Westport, CT: Greenwood, 1999. 
 Robert Aziz, The Syndetic Paradigm: The Untrodden Path Beyond Freud and Jung (2007), a refereed publication of The State University of New York Press. 
 Robert Aziz, Foreword in Lance Storm, ed., Synchronicity: Multiple Perspectives on Meaningful Coincidence. Pari, Italy: Pari Publishing, 2008. 
 Wallace Clift, Jung and Christianity: The Challenge of Reconciliation. New York: The Crossroad Publishing Company, 1982. 
 Edward F. Edinger, The Mystery of The Coniunctio, 
 Wolfgang Giegerich, The Soul's Logical Life, 
 James A Hall M.D., Jungian Dream Interpretation, 
 James Hillman, "Healing Fiction", 
 Montiel, Luis, "El rizoma oculto de la psicología profunda. Gustav Meyrink y Carl Gustav Jung", Frenia, 2012, 
 Catherine M Nutting, Concrete Insight: Art, the Unconscious, and Transformative Spontaneity, UVic Thesis 2007 214
 Stanton Marlan, Jung's Alchemical Philosophy. Psyche and the Mercurial Play of Image and Idea, Routledge, 2022, ISBN 9781032105444 
 Andrew Samuels, Critical Dictionary of Jungian Analysis, 
 June Singer, Boundaries of the Soul, . On psychotherapy
 Anthony Storr, Jung (1973)  
 — The Essential Jung (1983) 
 — The Essential Jung: Selected Writings (1999) 
 Marion Woodman, The Pregnant Virgin: A Process of Psychological Transformation, 
 Simosko, Vladimir. Jung, Music, and Music Therapy: Prepared for the Occasion of the C.G. "Jung and the Humanities" Colloquium, 1987. Winnipeg, Man., The Author, 1987

Academic texts
 Andrew Samuels, The Political Psyche (Routledge), 
 Lucy Huskinson, Nietzsche and Jung: The Whole Self in the Union of Opposites (Routledge), 
 Davydov, Andrey. From Carl Gustav Jung's Archetypes of the Collective Unconscious to Individual Archetypal Pattern. HPA Press, 2014. 
 Remo, F. Roth: Return of the World Soul, Wolfgang Pauli, C.G. Jung and the Challenge of Psychophysical Reality [unus mundus], Part 1: The Battle of the Giants. Pari Publishing, 2011, 
 Remo, F. Roth: Return of the World Soul, Wolfgang Pauli, C.G. Jung and the Challenge of Psychophysical Reality [unus mundus], Part 2: A Psychophysical Theory. Pari Publishing, 2012, 

Journals
 The Journal of Analytical Psychology (JAP at John Wiley & Sons) 
 International Journal for Jungian Studies (IJJS at Brill)

Jung-Freud relationship
 Kerr, John. A Most Dangerous Method: The Story of Jung, Freud, and Sabina Spielrein. Knopf, 1993. .

Other people's recollections of Jung
 van der Post, Laurens, Jung and the Story of Our Time, New York: Pantheon Books, 1975. 
 Hannah, Barbara, Jung, his life and work: a biographical memoir, New York: G. P. Putnam's Sons, 1976. SBN: 399-50383-8
 David Bailey's biography of his Great Aunt, Ruth Bailey, 'The English Woman and C.G.Jung' drawing extensively on her diaries and correspondence, explores the deep and long-lasting friendship between Ruth, Jung, and Jung's wife and family.

Critical scholarship
 Maidenbaum, Aryeh (ed), Jung and the Shadow of Anti-Semitism, Berwick ME: Nicolas-Hays Inc, 2002.
 Dohe, Carrie B. Jung's Wandering Archetype: Race and Religion in Analytical Psychology.  London: Routledge, 2016. 
 
 
 
 Richard Noll, The Aryan Christ: The Secret Life of Carl Jung (Random House, 1997)

External links

 
 
 
 C.G. Jung Institute, Zurich
 Museum House of C.G. Jung Küsnacht, Zurich (Switzerland)
 Carl Jung Resources
 The Jung Page
Philemon Foundation
 Carl Jung: Foreword to the I Ching
 The Association Method Full-text article from 1916. Originally Published in the Collected Papers on Analytical Psychology.
 The Seven Sermons to the Dead, 1916 Carl Gustav Jung
 The Theory of Psychoanalysis Full-text article from 1915. Originally published in The Journal of Nervous and Mental Disease
 Jung's "Essay on Wotan"
 Bollingen Foundation Collection From the Rare Book and Special Collections Division, Library of Congress
 BBC Face to Face interview, Carl Jung and John Freeman, 22 October 1959.
 The Journal of Analytical Psychology
 International Journal for Jungian Studies

 
1875 births
1961 deaths
20th-century Swiss philosophers
20th-century Swiss writers
20th-century psychologists
Academic staff of ETH Zurich
History of mental health
History of psychiatry
Pantheists
People associated with the University of Zurich
People from Arbon District
People from Küsnacht
People from Rapperswil-Jona
Psychodynamics
Jungian psychologists
Psychological astrology
Psychologists of religion
Psychology writers
Schizophrenia researchers
Swiss astrologers
Swiss autobiographers
Swiss people of German descent
Swiss philosophers
Swiss psychiatrists
Swiss psychologists
Calvinists
Swiss Calvinist and Reformed Christians
Symbologists
University of Basel alumni
Members of the Vienna Psychoanalytic Society
People associated with the University of Basel